Phelps may refer to:

Places in the United States
 Phelps, Kentucky
 Phelps, Michigan, an unincorporated community
 Phelps, New York
 Phelps (village), New York
 Phelps, Wisconsin, a town
 Phelps (community), Wisconsin, an unincorporated community
 Phelps County, Missouri
 Phelps County, Nebraska
 Phelps Lake (disambiguation)
 Lake Phelps

Other uses
 Phelps (surname)
 Phelps Phelps, 38th Governor of American Samoa and United States Ambassador to the Dominican Republic
 USS Phelps (DD-360), a US Navy destroyer

See also
 
 Philps, a surname